Apoctena fastigata is a species of moth in the family Tortricidae. It is found in New Zealand, where it is only found on the South Island.

The wingspan is 21–24 mm. The forewings are pale yellow, irrorated (speckled) with purplish-brown. The markings in the males very obscure. The hindwings are pale whitish yellow sprinkled with purplish-brown.

References

Moths described in 1916
Epitymbiini
Moths of New Zealand